Caernarvon (Morfa) was the temporary western terminus of the Carnarvon and Llanberis Railway, located on the southern fringe of Caernarfon, Gwynedd, Wales.

The line from Llanberis to Caernarfon was built from the country end, as were the other standard gauge routes to the town, resulting in there being three temporary termini on the edges of Caernarfon. This was eventually resolved by building the "Caernarfon Town Line" through a tunnel under the historic centre to join the various routes. When this was opened Morfa station was closed on 5 July 1870, though it appears that formal paperwork was not concluded until the following January. Freight and passenger trains passed through the station site until 1930, when regular passenger services were withdrawn.

Summer excursions to Llanberis passed through until September 1962 and freight lingered on until the line closed in 1964. The tracks were lifted in early 1965.

References

Sources

External links
 The station site on a navigable OS Map in National Library of Scotland
 The station and line in Rail Map Online
 The line CLS with mileages in Railway Codes

Disused railway stations in Gwynedd
Railway stations in Great Britain opened in 1869
Railway stations in Great Britain closed in 1871
Former London and North Western Railway stations
Llanrug